Jersey Select is an American women's soccer team founded in 2010. The team is a member of the Women's Premier Soccer League, the third tier of women's soccer in the United States and Canada. The team plays in the Mid-Atlantic Division of the East Conference.

The team plays its home games at Paul VI High School in Haddonfield, New Jersey. The club's colors are red and black.

The Select organization is owned and operated by the New Jersey Soccer Group, a management company for a family of soccer-based companies offering soccer services in New Jersey.

Players

Current roster

Year-by-year

Coaches
  Erwin van Bennekom (2010–present)
  George Rhea (2010–present)

Stadia
 Paul VI High School, Haddonfield, New Jersey (2010–present)

External links
 Official Site
 WPSL Millburn Magic page
 New Jersey Soccer Group Official Site

Women's Premier Soccer League teams
Women's soccer clubs in the United States
Soccer clubs in New Jersey
2010 establishments in New Jersey
Women's sports in New Jersey